Mike Berticelli (April 26, 1951 – January 25, 2000) as an American college soccer coach.

From 1990 to 1999, he served as the head men's soccer coach at the University of Notre Dame, where he compiled a 104–80–19(.559) record. He led the Fighting Irish to tournament appearances in 1993, 1994, and 1996. Notre Dame won two Midwestern Collegiate Conference championships and 1 Big East Tournament Coach of the Year title. He died on January 25, 2000, at the age of 48. He ended his career with a record of 291–135–42.

From 1984 to 1989, he was the head men's soccer coach at Old Dominion University, where he posted a 76–27–16 record in six seasons. His teams reached the championship game of the Sun Belt Conference Tournament every year he coached there. He led the Monarchs to two conference championships, and their first ever NCAA tournament appearance. He earned Sun Belt Conference Coach of the Year honors in 1984. The Monarchs were ranked in the top 20 in the nation the last five years he coached there. His teams sprung two upsets at Old Dominion over the No. 1 ranked team in the nation.

He also served as the head men's soccer coach at UNC-Greensboro from 1980 to 1983. He led the Spartans to Division III national championships in 1982 and 1983.

Sources
https://web.archive.org/web/20110726234251/http://www.odusports.com/sports/m-soccer/mtt/berticelli_mike00.html
http://grfx.cstv.com/photos/schools/nd/sports/m-soccer/auto_pdf/08msocmghistoryrecords1.pdf
https://news.google.com/newspapers?nid=2245&dat=20000126&id=zMY0AAAAIBAJ&sjid=NSEGAAAAIBAJ&pg=3466,2709809

Notre Dame Fighting Irish men's soccer coaches
Old Dominion Monarchs men's soccer coaches
UNC Greensboro Spartans men's soccer coaches
1951 births
2000 deaths
American soccer coaches